Sithara Krishnakumar (born 1 July 1986) is an Indian playback singer, composer, lyricist, classical dancer and an occasional actor. She predominantly works in Malayalam cinema in addition to Tamil, Telugu and Kannada films. Sithara is a well known singer who is trained in Hindustani and Carnatic classical music traditions and is also a recognised ghazal singer. She is the recipient of several awards which includes three Kerala State Film Award for Best Female Playback Singer.

She travels extensively and has performed in concerts and stage shows across the world. Folk and fusion being her other areas of interest. She has collaborated with various popular musical bands in Kerala as well as collaborated in many stage shows which includes international shows as well. In 2014, she formed a musical band Eastraga which focuses on a mix of female oriented songs backed by a team of renowned musicians. She is also part of the 6-member band named Sithara's Project Malabaricus, an independent venture which features contemporarised folk and classical songs.

Personal life

Sithara was born in Malappuram to K. M. Krishnakumar, an academician and Saly Krishnakumar. Born into a family inclined to classical arts, Sithara was introduced to the world of music as a child and started singing at the age of four. She attended St. Paul's Higher secondary School Thenhipalam, GMHSS Calicut University Campus School and NNM Higher secondary School Chelembra . She did her graduation in English Literature from Farook College, Feroke and secured her master's degree from Calicut University Campus, Kerala. She married Dr. Sajish M, a cardiologist, on 31 August 2007 and the couple has a daughter Saawan Rithu born on 9 June 2013. The family resides at Aluva, Kochi Kerala.

Career
She started off her art life as a dancer and eventually became a playback singer. She was trained in Carnatic Music by Sri Ramanattukara Satheesan Master and Palai CK Ramachandran. Sithara also received extensive education in Hindustani Classical music from Ustad Fiyaz Khan. She is also a classical dancer trained by Kalamandalam Vinodini. For her multifaceted talents, she was accoladed with the Kalathilakam title in Calicut University Arts Festival for two consecutive years(2005 and 2006). She holds master's degrees in Hindustani Khyal Music and Vocal Music from Rabindra Bharati University, Kolkata.

Sithara started off her playback singing career in the year 2007 with the song Pammi Pammi in Vinayan's Malayalam film Athishayan. Formerly, she was the winner of several musical talent shows like Asianet Saptha Swarangal (2004), Kairali TV Gandharva Sangeetham (Seniors) and Jeevan TV Voice 2004. She also won Jeevan TV's 20 million Apple Megastars in 2008. She has gained a good reputation as a devoted Ghazal singer and a passionate stage performer of other vocal genres. She has worked with noted composers like Ouseppachan, M. Jayachandran, G. V. Prakash Kumar, Prashant Pillai, Gopi Sundar, Bijibal, Shaan Rahman and rendered her voice to over 300 film songs including Malayalam and other Indian languages. Her works are of various genres.

In 2017, she turned composer with the single Ente Akasham, Written by herself. The video which officially got released at a program held by Kerala State Women's Development Corporation to commemorate International Women's Day, picturized the life of night-time female workers.

She turned film music composer with the film Udalaazham along with Mithun Jayaraj. The film is produced under the banner Doctor’s Dilemma – a doctor's collective which includes her husband Dr. Sajish. M. She made a cameo appearance in the Malayalam film Ganagandharvan directed by Ramesh Pisharody.

Awards

Kerala State Film Awards:

 2012 – Best Singer – Celluloid – "Enundodee"
 2017 – Best Singer – Vimaanam – "Vaanamakalunnuvo"
 2021 – Best Singer – Kaanekkaane – "Paalnilavin"

South Indian International Movie Awards:

2014 – Best Female Playback Singer  – Mr. Fraud – "Sadaa Paalaya"
2019 – Best Female Playback Singer  – Eeda – "Marivil"

Asianet Film Awards:

2016 – Most Popular Duet Song – Jacobinte Swargarajyam – "Thiruvavani raavu"

Asiavision Awards:

2017 – Best Singer (Female) – Udaharanam Sujatha – "Ethu Mazhayilum"

Mirchi Music Awards South:

2012 – Best Female Playback Singer in Tamil – Muppozhudhum Un Karpanaigal – "Kangal Neeye"
2019 - Best Female Playback Singer in Malayalam - Kumbalangi Nights -  "Cherathukal"

Mazhavil Music Awards
2019 - Best Female Playback Singer - Madhura Raja - "Mohamundiri"
2020 - Best Female Playback Singer
2021 - Best Female Playback Singer - Kaanekkaane - "Paalnilavin"

Janmabhumi Film Awards:
2018 – Best Female Playback Singer - Eeda - "Marivil"

Mangalam Music Awards:

2017 – Best Female Playback Singer

Yuva Awards:

2017 – Best Female Playback Singer

Red FM Malayalam Music Awards:

2017 – Best Female Playback Singer

Anand TV Awards:

2018 – Best Female Playback Singer
2016 – Best Female Playback Singer

Federation of Kerala Associations in North America Awards:

2016 – Best Female Playback Singer – Lailaa O Lailaa – "Nanayumee Mazhai"

Other Awards:

2002 – Baburaj Memorial Award  – Best Female Singer
2004 – Swaralaya Kairali Yesudas Award  – Best Singer
2009 – Drishya Award  – Best Female Album Singer
2011 – Mohammed Rafi Memorial Award  – Best Playback Singer
2011 – Vayalar Samskarika Vedi Award  – Best Playback Singer
2012 – Kannur Rajan Memorial Award  – Best Playback Singer
2012 – L Channel Award  – Best Playback Singer
2012 – Inspire Film Award  – Best Playback Singer
2019 - Johnson Music Awards - Best Playback Singer
2020 - Muzic2morrow Awards - Best Female Singer
2020 - Movie Street Film Awards - Best Female Playback Singer
2022 - Swaralaya - KPAC Sulochana Award

Discography

As composer

Albums

Films

As Playback Singer 
All songs are in Malayalam language unless otherwise noted.

TV series title song

Albums(Non-film songs)

Malayalam film songs

Discography (other languages)

Tamil

Kannada

Telugu

Filmography as Actor

Television shows

References

External links
 Official Website
 
 Facebook

1986 births
Living people
Indian women playback singers
Indian women classical singers
Malayalam playback singers
Tamil playback singers
Telugu playback singers
Kannada playback singers
Musicians from Kozhikode
Indian women ghazal singers
Indian ghazal singers
Singers from Kerala
University of Calicut alumni
Film musicians from Kerala
21st-century Indian singers
Women Carnatic singers
Carnatic singers
Indian women folk singers
Indian folk singers
21st-century Indian women singers
Women musicians from Kerala
Actresses in Malayalam cinema